Narong Kakada (born 5 July 1999), is a Cambodian footballer currently playing as a midfielder for Preah Khan Reach Svay Rieng in the Cambodian Premier League, and the Cambodia national team.

References

External links
 

1999 births
Living people
Cambodian footballers
Cambodia international footballers
Association football forwards
21st-century Cambodian people